Arthur Redden (born June 19, 1936) is an American boxer. A U.S. Marine, he competed in the men's light heavyweight event at the 1968 Summer Olympics. At the 1968 Summer Olympics, he lost to Georgi Stankov of Bulgaria. Previously he played football and was a track and field athlete at Arkansas AM & N.

He was a contestant on a 1971 episode of the syndicated version of Hollywood Squares.

References

1936 births
Living people
Light-heavyweight boxers
American male boxers
Olympic boxers of the United States
Boxers at the 1968 Summer Olympics
Boxers at the 1967 Pan American Games
Pan American Games medalists in boxing
Pan American Games gold medalists for the United States
Sportspeople from Wilmington, Delaware
Boxers from Delaware
Arkansas–Pine Bluff Golden Lions football players
Players of American football from Delaware
Track and field athletes from Delaware
United States Marines
Medalists at the 1967 Pan American Games